Three ships of the United States Navy have been named Cormorant, after the Cormorant, a genus of web-footed sea birds.

 , was launched on 5 February 1919 by Todd Shipbuilding Corporation in New York City.
 , was launched on 8 June 1953 by Mare Island Naval Shipyard.
 , is the seventh ship of s.

References 

United States Navy ship names